The Ana people, also known as the Atakpame people, are an ethnic group of Benin and Togo. The Ana are concentrated between Atakpame, primarily in the Gnagna and Djama quarters, as well as between Atakpame and Sokode and down to the Togo-Benin border. Ethnologists identify the Ana as the most western of the Yoruba subgroups. In fact, the Ana trace their origins to Ife, and their language is also called Ife, which has about 210,000 speakers.

References

Ethnic groups in Togo
Ethnic groups in Benin
Yoruba subgroups